On March 11, 2014, a bus crashed into a parked car near Suez, Egypt.

History
The bus departed from South Sinai and was headed to Al-Mansoura. While driving near the city of Suez, a car appeared that was driving on the wrong side of the road. The car also had its headlights turned on. As a result, the headlights blinded the driver of the bus. The bus driver then attempted to avoid hitting the car, but ending up hitting a parked car in the process.

Twenty-five people were killed and twenty-seven people were injured when the bus crashed into the parked car. The bus was carrying fifty people when it crashed. Ten of the people who were injured were in serious condition after the crash.

References

Bus incidents in Egypt